Sweet Little Lies may refer to:

 Sweet Little Lies (2010 film), Japanese film
 Sweet Little Lies (2012 film), Romanian film
 Sweet Little Lies, 2010 novel by Lauren Conrad
 "Sweet Little Lies", a 2019 song by the singer Bülow

See also
 "Little Lies", a song by the English/American rock band Fleetwood Mac